James Edwin Ellerbe (January 12, 1867October 24, 1916) was a U.S. Representative from South Carolina.

Born in Sellers, South Carolina, Ellerbe attended Pine Hill Academy and the University of South Carolina at Columbia.
He graduated from Wofford College, Spartanburg, South Carolina, in 1887, where he was a member of the Chi Phi Fraternity.
He engaged in agricultural pursuits.
He served as member of the State house of representatives 1894-1896.
He served as delegate to the State constitutional convention in 1895.

Ellerbe was elected as a Democrat to the Fifty-ninth and to the three succeeding Congresses (March 4, 1905 – March 3, 1913).
He was an unsuccessful candidate for renomination in 1912.
He resumed his agricultural pursuits.
He died in Asheville, North Carolina, October 24, 1916.
He was interred in the family burial ground near Sellers, South Carolina.

Sources

1867 births
1916 deaths
University of South Carolina alumni
Wofford College alumni
Democratic Party members of the South Carolina House of Representatives
Democratic Party members of the United States House of Representatives from South Carolina
19th-century American politicians